Elette Boyle is an American and Israeli computer scientist and cryptographer, known for her research on secret sharing, digital signatures, and obfuscation. She is a professor of computer science at the Interdisciplinary Center Herzliya, where she directs the Center for Foundations and Applications of Cryptographic Theory.

Education and career
Boyle is originally from Yamhill, Oregon. She studied mathematics at the California Institute of Technology, competed for Caltech in the high jump, and was named Caltech's female scholar-athlete of the year for 2007–2008. After graduating in 2008, she completed her Ph.D. at the Massachusetts Institute of Technology, under the joint supervision of Shafi Goldwasser and Yael Tauman Kalai. Before joining the IDC Herzliya faculty, she was a postdoctoral researcher at the Technion – Israel Institute of Technology and at Cornell University.

Recognition
A paper by Boyle on secret sharing using homomorphic encryption was given the best paper award at the 2016 International Cryptology Conference (Crypto). She was an invited plenary speaker at Public Key Cryptography 2018.

References

External links

Year of birth missing (living people)
Living people
People from Yamhill, Oregon
American computer scientists
American women computer scientists
Israeli computer scientists
Israeli women computer scientists
California Institute of Technology alumni
Massachusetts Institute of Technology School of Science alumni
Academic staff of Reichman University
Theoretical computer scientists
Modern cryptographers
21st-century American scientists
21st-century American women scientists
21st-century American mathematicians
21st-century women mathematicians
American women mathematicians
American cryptographers
Israeli cryptographers
Israeli women mathematicians